The Count of Marialva was a Portuguese title of nobility created by a royal decree, issued in 1440, by King Afonso V of Portugal, and granted to Vasco Fernandes Coutinho (from a family descendency dating to the old Portuguese nobility), the third Marshal of Portugal.

List of counts
 Vasco Fernandes Coutinho (1385);
 Gonçalo Coutinho, 2nd Count of Marialva (1415);
 João Coutinho, 3rd Count of Marialva (1450);
 Francisco Coutinho, 4th Count of Marialva (1480), married to Beatriz de Meneses, 2nd Countess of Loulé;
 Guiomar Coutinho, 5th Countess of Marialva (1510), 3rd Countess of Loulé, who married Fernando, Duke of Guarda.

References
 

1440 establishments in Portugal